Richard Patrick Boyle Davey (12 July 1848 – 25 November 1911) was an English author and journalist.

Life
Davey was born on 12 July 1848 at Mileham, Norfolk, as the youngest son of Richard and Eliza Davey. After studying in France and Italy, Davey moved to New York City in 1870 and became an editor for Spirit of the Times. In 1880 he returned to England to write for The Morning Post. He also wrote for The Fortnightly Review, the National Review, The Nineteenth Century, the Saturday Review, and other publications. He wrote two historical novels and four plays. His non-fiction books include profiles of Cuba and Turkey based on his travels, and a series of books on the lives of famous women. In 1907, he married Eleanora Denman, a granddaughter of Thomas Denman, 1st Baron Denman. Davey died on 25 November 1911 in Venice, Italy.

Works

Novels and short stories
A Royal Amour, 1882
The Sand Sea, and Other Stories, 1896
Wetherleigh: A Romance of Hampton Court, 1897

Plays
Paul and Virginia, 1886
Lesbia, 1888
L'Heritage d'Helene (with Lucy H. Hooper), 1889, performed in English under multiple titles including Helen's Inheritance and Inherited
St. Ronan's Well, 1893
Marion de L'Orme, 1894, adapted from the play by Victor Hugo

Non-fiction
A History of Mourning, 1889
Furs and Fur Garments, 1895
The Sultan and His Subjects, 1897
Victoria, Queen and Empress, 1897
Cuba Past and Present, 1898
Mary Tudor, 1898
Historical London, 1902
Life of Lady Jane Grey, 1902
Lucrezia Borgia, 1903
Botticelli, 1903
The Pageant of London, 1906
The Italian Renaissance, 1906
The Nine Days' Queen, Lady Jane Grey, and Her Times, 1909
The Tower of London, 1910
The Sisters of Lady Jane Grey and Their Wicked Grandfather, 1911

References

External links

1848 births
1911 deaths
19th-century English dramatists and playwrights
19th-century English novelists
English journalists
English male dramatists and playwrights
English male journalists
English male non-fiction writers
English male novelists
English non-fiction writers
People from Breckland District
Writers from Norfolk